Volleyball at the 2016 South Asian Games were held in Guwahati, India from 9 to 16 February 2016.

Medalists

Medal table

Draw

Men

Group A
 (Host)
 

Group B

Women

Group A
 (Host)
 
 

Group B

References

External links
Official website

2016 South Asian Games
Events at the 2016 South Asian Games
2016
South Asian Games
2016 South Asian Games